The M142 HIMARS (M142 High Mobility Artillery Rocket System) is a light multiple rocket launcher developed in the late 1990s for the United States Army and mounted on a standard United States Army Family of Medium Tactical Vehicles (FMTV) truck frame.

The HIMARS carries one pod with either six GMLRS rockets or one ATACMS missile. It is based on the United States Army's FMTV five-ton truck, and is capable of launching all rockets specified in the Multiple Launch Rocket System Family of Munitions (MFOM). HIMARS ammunition pods are interchangeable with the M270 MLRS; however, it is limited to a single pod as opposed to the standard two for the M270 and its variants.

The launcher can be transported by Airbus A400M Atlas and Lockheed C-130 Hercules aircraft. The FMTV truck that transports the HIMARS was initially produced by BAE Systems Mobility & Protection Systems (formerly Armor Holdings Aerospace and Defense Group Tactical Vehicle Systems Division), the original equipment manufacturer of the FMTV. It was produced by the Oshkosh Corporation from 2010 to 2017. Usage in the Russo-Ukrainian War has led to production being restarted for over a dozen nations.

Development 
The requirement for HIMARS first came about in 1982, when the 9th Infantry Division (Motorized) saw the need to acquire a light multiple rocket launcher as a counterfire asset, but the requirement failed to gather support from the Field Artillery School and languished for a number of years. The institutional bias at the time was oriented towards heavy forces. However, with the waning of the Cold War and the growing interest in low-intensity operations, both Field Artillery School and Missile Command realized that the M270 MLRS was too heavy for rapid deployment and pushed for the funding of HIMARS. The Gulf War gave a further incentive towards fielding a lightweight MLRS, when the M270 proved too costly in airlift assets to deploy in theater and the launchers did not arrive with the initial wave of U.S. troops. The HIMARS concept was tested on April 1991 at White Sands Missile Range, using a modified Honest John launcher.

HIMARS was then developed as a private venture by Loral Vought Systems (later Lockheed Martin Missiles and Fire Control) to meet this requirement. The system first appeared publicly in 1993. In 1996, the U.S. Army Missile Command awarded Lockheed Martin a $23.2 million contract to build four prototypes. The vehicles were delivered to the XVIII Airborne Corps in April 1998 for a two-year evaluation with 3rd Battalion, 27th Field Artillery Regiment. In July 1998, the Army conducted a test firing of the ATACMS. In December 1999, the Aviation and Missile Command awarded Lockheed Martin a $65 million contract for engineering and manufacturing development. Under this contract, Lockheed Martin delivered six HIMARS in late 2001 for Army evaluation. In April 2003, the Army awarded Lockheed Martin a $96 million contract to begin low rate initial production. Around this time, the Marine Corps placed an order for two units for evaluation purposes.

The launcher system and chassis are produced by Lockheed Martin Missiles & Fire Control in Camden, Arkansas as of 2019.

Design
The HIMARS is similar in design to the M270 Multiple Launch Rocket System (MLRS), with the main exception being that it is a wheeled vehicle as opposed to tracked vehicle. The HIMARS carries one ordnance pod, which is identical to the two pods used by the M270. The windows are made of sheets of sapphire laminated with glass and polycarbonate.

The HIMARS was also tested as a unified launch system for both artillery rockets and the SLAMRAAM surface-launched variant of the AMRAAM anti-aircraft missile.

In October 2017, a Marine Corps HIMARS fired a rocket while at sea against a land target for the first time from the deck of the amphibious transport dock , demonstrating the system's ability to operate while on ships to deliver precision fire from a standoff range against shore defenses. The vehicle's targeting software was reworked so it can better fire while on a launch platform in motion.

By early 2022, Lockheed Martin was producing HIMARS at a rate of 48 launchers annually, but following the start of the 2022 Russian invasion of Ukraine that rate was increased to 60. In October 2022 the company announced it would boost production to 96 systems annually in response to increased demand caused by the war; limitations in building new industrial capacity means it will be several months before production can be ramped up from five to eight vehicles monthly.

Operational history

Afghanistan and the Middle East

In February 2010, the International Security Assistance Force (ISAF) for Afghanistan indicated in a press release that two rockets fired from a HIMARS were believed to have fallen 300 metres short of their intended target, killing 12 civilians during Operation Moshtarak. ISAF suspended the use of the HIMARS until a full review of the incident was completed. A British officer later said that the rockets were on target, that the target was in use by the Taliban, and that use of the system had been reinstated. Reports indicated that the civilian deaths were due to the Taliban's use of human shields; the presence of civilians at that location had not been known to the ISAF forces. A report in the New York Times in October 2010 credited the HIMARS with aiding the NATO offensive in Kandahar by targeting Taliban commanders' hideouts, forcing many to flee to Pakistan, at least temporarily.

In November 2015, the U.S. Army revealed that it had deployed the HIMARS to Iraq, firing at least 400 rockets at Islamic State (ISIL) targets since the beginning of that summer. HIMARS detachments were sent to Al Asad Airbase and Al-Taqaddum Air Base in Al Anbar Governorate. In March 2016, a U.S. Army HIMARS fired rockets into Syria for the first time in support of Syrian rebels fighting ISIL, from launchers based in neighboring Jordan.

In January 2016, Lockheed announced that the HIMARS had reached 1 million operational hours with U.S. forces, achieving a 99 percent operational readiness rate.

In April 2016, it was announced that the U.S. would be deploying the HIMARS in Turkey near the border with Syria as part of the battle with ISIL. In early September, international media and the U.S. State Department reported a newly deployed HIMARS had engaged ISIL targets in Syria near the Turkish border.

In June 2017, a HIMARS was deployed at Al-Tanf, Syria, to support U.S.-backed rebels in the area.

On 24 May 2018, a HIMARS strike killed 50 Taliban fighters and leaders in Musa Qala, Afghanistan. Three rockets struck the building within a 14-second timespan.

In September 2018, US support forces coordinated with Syrian Democratic Forces fighting to defeat ISIS in east Syria in the Deir ez-Zor campaign, sometimes striking ISIS positions with GMLRS rockets 30 times per day.

Ukraine

On 1 June 2022, the US announced that it would be supplying four HIMARS to Ukraine with M31 GMLRS unitary rockets. On 23 June, the first HIMARS arrived in Ukraine, according to Ukrainian Defense Minister Oleksii Reznikov. On 25 June 2022, Ukraine started deploying the system against Russian forces during the 2022 Russian invasion of Ukraine. According to the Commander-in-Chief of the Armed Forces of Ukraine, Valeriy Zaluzhnyi, "Artillerymen of the Armed Forces of Ukraine hit ... military targets of the enemy on our, Ukrainian, territory". The Ukrainian military stated that this first strike, on a Russian base in Izyum, killed over 40 soldiers. The day before, a second batch of four was announced to be delivered in mid-July.

On 1 July, a US defense official told reporters that Ukraine had been using the system to destroy Russian command posts: "selecting targets and then accurately hitting them ... degrading Russian capability". On 18 July, Zaluzhnyi said: "An important factor contributing to our retention of defensive lines and positions is the timely arrival of M142 HIMARS, which deliver surgical strikes on enemy control posts, ammunition and fuel storage depots."

Another four HIMARS were announced for delivery on 8 July, the delivery spacing driven by the weeks-long process to train Ukrainian troops on how to use the platform. To avoid escalating the conflict, US restricted Ukraine from firing HIMARS rockets into Russian territory. For the same reason, the US has not provided Ukraine with the longer-range ATACMS missile, which could easily engage targets inside of Russia.

A fourth batch of four was announced on 20 July, bringing the total number of HIMARS committed to Ukraine to 16. Ukrainian Defense Minister Reznikov stated that the country needed "at least 100" of the system and that by that point, eight systems had destroyed 30 command stations and ammunition storage facilities, decreasing the intensity of Russian shelling and slowing their advance. In that announcement, it was revealed that the number delivered had reached 12 launchers. That number had increased to 16 by 1 August.

On 30 August, 2022, The Washington Post reported on Ukrainian claims to have successfully used decoy HIMARS units made out of wood to draw at least 10 Russian 3M-54 Kalibr cruise missiles. One US diplomat was reported to state that Russian sources had claimed more HIMARS destroyed than the US had sent. A Pentagon official had earlier in the month asserted that no HIMARS had been destroyed at that time. On 8 September, US General Mark Milley, chairman of the Joint Chiefs of Staff, told reporters: "We are seeing real and measurable gains from Ukraine in the use of these systems. For example, the Ukrainians have struck over 400 targets with the HIMARS and they've had devastating effect".

A further 18 HIMARS were announced on 28 September, however it was part of an aid package aimed at meeting Ukraine's mid- and long-term needs, so deliveries are to begin in six months at the earliest. Ukraine had previously been provided with only M31 Unitary Warhead missiles, which are "not ideal against targets spread over large areas, as the deadly chunks are not designed to fly far." As of early October they have been granted the M30A1 which uses the Alternative Warhead that can cover up to "half a square mile of land in a single salvo" with 180,000 tungsten steel BB sized balls. The US also announced on 4 October that four more HIMARS launchers would be provided from US military stockpiles, to increase the total to 20 HIMARS in Ukrainian service.

HIMARS attacks by Ukraine have been credited with "destroy Russian command nodes, tens of thousands of howitzer artillery rounds and a staggering 20 million small-arms rounds." As of 11 November 2022, a senior U.S. official stated no HIMARS systems have been destroyed after five months in operational use. In response to the effects of HIMARS, Russian Defense Minister Sergei Shoigu declared the HIMARS system as a high priority target for Russian troops. Ukrainian officials identified Russia's kamikaze drones as the biggest threat to the HIMARS system.

Armament 

The HIMARS can fire the following rockets and missiles:

MLRS 
MLRS is series of 227 mm rockets.

See section  in main article M270 Multiple Launch Rocket System for more details on the M26

M26 rockets carrying 644 DPICM M77 submunitions. Range: .
 M26A1 ER rockets carrying 518 M85 submunitions. Range: .
 M26A2 ER rockets carrying 518 M77 submunitions. Range: .
 AT2 German M26 variant carrying 28 AT2 anti-tank mines. Range: 

The M28 rockets are a variant of the unguided M26 rockets of the M270 system. Each rocket pod contains 6 identical rockets.

 M28 practice rockets. An M26 variant with three ballast containers and three smoke-marking containers in place of the submunition payload.
 M28A1 Reduced-Range Practice Rocket (RRPR) with blunt nose.
 M28A2 Low-Cost Reduced-Range Practice Rocket (LCRRPR) with blunt nose.

GMLRS 
Guided Multiple Launch Rocket System (GMLRS) 227mm rockets have an extended range and add GPS-aided guidance to their Inertial Navigation System. GMLRS rockets were introduced in 2005 and the M30 and M31 rockets are, except for their warheads, identical.  50,000 GMLRS rockets have been produced, with yearly production now exceeding 9,000 rockets. Each rocket pod contains 6 identical rockets. Most of GMLRS series rockets have effective range of up to 92 km.
 M30 rockets carrying 404 DPICM M101 submunitions. Range: . 3,936 produced between 2004 and 2009, production ceased in favor of the M30A1. The remaining M30 rockets are being updated with either the M30A1 or M31A1 warhead.
 M30A1 rockets with Alternative Warhead (AW). Range: . GMLRS rocket that replaces the M30's submunitions with approximately 182,000 pre-formed tungsten fragments for area effects without unexploded ordnance. Entered production in 2015. This warhead is superior not just because it does not use cluster munitions but is also superior to a normal high explosive round: "A high explosive round is very impressive because it produces a big bomb and large pieces of shrapnel, but this round is small pellets and covers a much larger area."
 M30A2 rockets with Alternative Warhead (AW). Range: . Improved M30A1 with Insensitive Munition Propulsion System (IMPS). Only M30 variant in production since 2019.
Range: . Entered production in 2005. The warhead is produced by General Dynamics and contains  of PBX-109 high explosive in a steel blast-fragmentation case.
Range: . Improved M31 with new multi-mode fuze that added airburst to the M31's fuze point detonation and delay.
Range: . Improved M31A1 with Insensitive Munition Propulsion System (IMPS). Only M31 variant in production since 2019.
Rockets use a slightly increased rocket motor size, a newly designed hull, and tail-driven guidance while still containing six per pod. It will come in unitary and AW variants. The first successful test flight of an ER GMLRS occurred in March 2021. Lockheed Martin anticipates adding the ER to its production line in the fiscal year 2023 contract award, and is planning to produce the new rockets at its Camden facility. Full operational capability is planned for 2025. In 2022 Finland became the first foreign customer to order ER GMLRS. In November 2022 Lithuania announced that it will obtain GMLRS-ER. In February 2023, Poland ordered GMLRS-ER AW missiles.

GLSDB 

The Ground Launched Small Diameter Bomb (GLSDB) is a weapon made by Boeing and the Saab Group, who modified Boeing's GBU-39 Small Diameter Bomb (SDB) with the addition of a rocket motor.

ATACMS 

Each rocket pod contains one ATACMS missile. , only the M48, M57, and M57E1 remain in the US military's arsenal.

 M39 (ATACMS BLOCK I) missile with inertial guidance. The missile carries 950 M74 Anti-personnel and Anti‑materiel (APAM) bomblets. Range: . 1,650 M39 were produced between 1990 and 1997, when production ceased in favor of the M39A1. During Desert Storm 32 M39 were fired at Iraqi targets, and during Operation Iraqi Freedom a further 379 M39 were fired. The remaining M39 missiles are being updated to M57E1 missiles. The M39 is the only ATACMS variant, which can be fired by all MLRS and HIMARS variants.
 M39A1 (ATACMS BLOCK IA) missile with GPS-aided guidance. The missile carries 300 M74 APAM bomblets. Range: . 610 M39A1 were produced between 1997 and 2003. During Operation Iraqi Freedom 74 M39A1 were fired at Iraqi targets. The remaining M39A1 missiles are being updated to M57E1 missiles. The M39A1 and all subsequently introduced ATACMS missiles can be used only with the M270A1 (or variants thereof) and the HIMARS.
 M48 (ATACMS Quick Reaction Unitary; QRU) missile with GPS-aided guidance. The missile carries the 500 lb WDU-18/B penetrating high-explosive blast fragmentation warhead of the US Navy's Harpoon anti-ship missile. Range: . 176 M48 were produced between 2001 and 2004, when production ceased in favor of the M57. During Operation Iraqi Freedom 16 M48 were fired at Iraqi targets; a further 42 M48 were fired during Operation Enduring Freedom. The remaining M48 missiles remain in the U.S. Army and US Marine Corps' arsenal.
 M57 (ATACMS TACMS 2000) missile with GPS-aided guidance. The missile carries the same WDU-18/B warhead as the M48. Range: . 513 M57 were produced between 2004 and 2013.
 M57E1 (ATACMS Modification; MOD) missile with GPS-aided guidance. The M57E1 is the designation for upgraded M39 and M39A1 with re-grained motor, updated navigation and guidance software and hardware, and a WDU-18/B unitary warhead instead of the M74 APAM bomblets. The M57E1 ATACMS MOD also includes a proximity sensor for airburst detonation. Production commenced in 2017 with an initial order for 220 upgraded M57E1. The program is slated to end in 2024 with the introduction of the Precision Strike Missile (PrSM), which will replace the ATACMS missiles in the US arsenal.

PrSM 

The Precision Strike Missile (PrSM) is a new series of GPS-guided missiles, which will begin to replace ATACMS missiles in 2024. PrSM missiles can be launched from the M270A2 and the HIMARS, with rockets pods containing 2 missiles.  the PrSM is in low-rate initial production with 110 missiles being delivered to the US military over the year. PrSM will enter operational service in 2023.

Related developments
Lockheed Martin UK and INSYS had jointly developed a demonstrator rocket artillery system similar to HIMARS for the British Army's "Lightweight Mobile Artillery Weapon System/Rocket" (LIMAWS(R)) program. The system consisted of a single MLRS pod, mounted on a Supacat SPV600 chassis. The LIMAWS(R) program was canceled in September 2007.

Lockheed Martin and Thales Australia are discussing with the Australian government, manufacturing HIMARS rockets in Australia, due in part to concerns of resupply during conflict. Australia has the ability to manufacture the rockets but it depends on the technology (specifically the guidance components) being authorized by the US government. In November 2022, the publication The Strategist (published by the Australian Strategic Policy Institute) warned that "acquiring the missile-delivery system without a dedicated surveillance and target acquisition, or STA, capability means that Australia's long-range fires will have no eyes."

Operators

Current operators

United States Army
 Active duty
 17th Field Artillery Brigade (17th FAB)
 5th Battalion 3rd Field Artillery Regiment (5-3rd FAR)
 1st Battalion 94th Field Artillery Regiment (1-94th FAR)
 18th Field Artillery Brigade (18th FAB)
 3rd Battalion 27th Field Artillery Regiment (3-27th FAR)
 3rd Battalion 321st Field Artillery Regiment (3-321st FAR)
 41st Field Artillery Brigade (41st FAB)
 1st Battalion 77th Field Artillery Regiment (1-77th FAR)
 75th Field Artillery Brigade (75th FAB)
 1st Battalion 14th Field Artillery Regiment
 Army National Guard (ARNG)
 45th Field Artillery Brigade (Oklahoma Army National Guard)
 1st Battalion, 158th Field Artillery Regiment (Oklahoma Army National Guard)
 4th Battalion, 133rd Field Artillery Regiment (Texas Army National Guard)
 65th Field Artillery Brigade (Utah Army National Guard)
 5th Battalion 113th Field Artillery Regiment (North Carolina Army National Guard)
 115th Field Artillery Brigade (Wyoming Army National Guard)
 1st Battalion 121st Field Artillery Regiment (Wisconsin Army National Guard)
 2nd Battalion 300th Field Artillery Regiment (Wyoming Army National Guard)
 130th Field Artillery Brigade (Kansas Army National Guard)
 2nd Battalion 130th Field Artillery Regiment (Kansas Army National Guard)
 138th Field Artillery Brigade (Kentucky Army National Guard)
 3rd Battalion 116th Field Artillery Regiment (Florida Army National Guard)
 1st Battalion 623rd Field Artillery Regiment (Kentucky Army National Guard)
 142nd Field Artillery Brigade (Arkansas Army National Guard)
 1st Battalion 181st Field Artillery Regiment (Tennessee National Guard)
 169th Field Artillery Brigade (Colorado Army National Guard)
 3rd Battalion 157th Field Artillery Regiment (Colorado Army National Guard)
 197th Field Artillery Brigade (New Hampshire Army National Guard)
 3rd Battalion 197th Field Artillery Regiment (New Hampshire Army National Guard)
 1st Battalion 182nd Field Artillery Regiment (Michigan Army National Guard)
 United States Marine Corps
 1st Battalion 10th Marine Regiment
 2nd Battalion 10th Marine Regiment
 5th Battalion 11th Marine Regiment
 3rd Battalion 12th Marine Regiment
 2nd Battalion 14th Marine Regiment

 Romanian Land Forces (54)
 8th Tactical Operational Missile Brigade, including ATACMS missiles 

 Singapore Army (18)
 23rd Battalion, Singapore Artillery (23 SA) 

 Ukrainian Ground Forces (20 delivered, plus 18 future deliveries)

 United Arab Emirates Army (12) 

 Royal Jordanian Army (12)
 29th HIMARS Battalion, Jordan Royal Artillery Command

Future operators

 Australian Army: The Pentagon reported that the Australian Army had asked to purchase 20 HIMARS at a cost of "between one and two billion [Australian] dollars", with the sale being approved by the U.S. State Department on 26 May 2022.

 Estonian Land Forces: On 15 July 2022, United States approved the sale of six systems to Estonia as part of package estimated at $500 million, with a contract signed in December 2022.
 
 Latvian Land Forces: On 12 October 2022, Latvian Ministry of Defense announced that the country will acquire six systems.
 
 Lithuanian Land Forces: On 9 November 2022, the US State Department approved the sale of 8 systems and over 800 missiles, including the ATACMS, and the contract was signed in December 2022.
 
 Royal Netherlands Army: A request to buy 20 M142 HIMARS, 39 M30A2 GMLRS, 38 M31A2 and 80 M57 ATACMS was approved in February 2023.
  
 Polish Land Forces: On 29 November 2018 the US State Department approved the sale of 20 systems to Poland. In February 2023, the US cleared the sale of 486 additional launchers: 18 complete systems and 468 Launcher Loader Module kits.
 
 Republic of China Army: On 21 October 2020, the US government approved the sale of 11 HIMARS to Taiwan. Plans to order additional 18 launchers due to the cancellation of M109A6 howitzer orders.

See also
 List of U.S. Army rocket launchers

Weapons of comparable role, performance and era
LAR-160
Astros II MLRS
M-87 Orkan
K239 Chunmoo
 Tornado

References

External links 

 
 M142 HIMARS Lockheed Martin High Mobility Artillery Rocket System (Army recognition)
 High Mobility Artillery Rocket System (HIMARS) 
 Information about M26/M30/M31 MLRS rockets on designation-systems.net 
 Use of HIMARS system suspended in Afghanistan after 12 civilians killed by 300m targeting error
 HIMARS Technical Manuals

Military vehicles introduced in the 2000s
Modular rocket launchers
Multiple rocket launchers of the United States
Self-propelled artillery of the United States
Wheeled self-propelled rocket launchers
Military equipment of the 2022 Russian invasion of Ukraine